A puppy is a juvenile dog.

Puppy or puppies may also refer to:

Art and literature 
 Puppy (2005 film), an independent Australian feature film
 Puppy (2019 film), an Indian Tamil-language comedy drama film
 Puppy (2022 film), a South Korean film
 Puppy (Alice's Adventures in Wonderland), a fictional character in Lewis Carroll's Alice's Adventures in Wonderland
 "Puppy" (short story), by George Saunders, from his collection Tenth of December
 Puppy (Koons), a sculpture by Jeff Koons
 Puppy! (Hotel Transylvania), a 2017 short film set in the Hotel Transylvania franchise universe
 The puppies, fictional characters from the novel Animal Farm

Music 
 The Puppies (New wave band) a 1980s new wave band from San Diego
 The Puppies, a 1990s rap group
 Puppy (band) an alternative metal band
 Puppy (Fluke album), 2003
 Puppy (YuiKaori album), 2011
 Puppy (A Boy's Truly Rough), an album by Hawksley Workman, 2006
 "We Can Only Live Today (Puppy)", a song by Netsky

Technology 
 Puppy Linux, a Live CD Linux distribution
 Clement Ivanov, 'Puppey', DotA 2 eSports player

Television 
 Nick Jr. Puppies, a Nickelodeon television series
 "Puppies", an episode of the television series Zoboomafoo
 "Puppies", an episode of the television series Teletubbies
 "The Puppy Episode", a 1997 episode of the TV sitcom Ellen

See also
 Puppy play, a form of animal roleplay
 Pup (disambiguation)